Kung Fu Chaos is a 3D fighting party game developed by Just Add Monsters and published by Microsoft Game Studios. It was released worldwide for the Xbox in 2003. The game's theme song during the opening intro is Kung Fu Fighting by Carl Douglas.

Plot 
Kung Fu Chaos often breaks the fourth wall. The entire game is about the player controlling a selection of characters making a kung fu film. The actions of these characters are then processed as films and the player can watch them. Although the game is centered on a classic kung fu film, it has certain characters and levels that do not belong in a martial arts film (such as a city under attack by aliens).

Characters

Playable 
Master Sho Yu: An elderly martial arts master.
Ninja Fu Hiya: A blue ninja. Prized possession is his signed poster of Bruce Lee.
Monkey: A parody of the Monkey King from Journey to the West. Became immortal after urinating on the Mountain king's favorite tablecloth.
Lucy Cannon: A parody of blaxploitation heroines such as Foxy Brown and Cleopatra Jones. Prized possession is Babydoll, her shotgun.
Xui Tan Sour: A young martial artist who seeks to avenge her parents, who were killed by members of a rival circus, parodying the idea that in martial arts films, the hero/heroine is avenging their families' death from a rival, often a rival clan.
Chop & Styx: A samurai and baby pair that parodies Lone Wolf and Cub.

Unlockable 
Candi Roll: A roller-skating blonde.
Captain Won Ton: An overweight luchador. Wrestler by day, justice avenger by the rest of the day.
Shao Ting: The film's loud and obnoxious director. He also serves as the final boss of the game. He sees himself as a womanizer, and after creating Kung Fu Chaos the Movie, with no plot whatsoever, he creates an experimental art film where he runs around naked for two hours chased by zombie nurses.

Development
Kung Fu Chaos is the first game developed by the Cambridge-based developer Just Add Monsters. The game's concept was co-created by design director Tameem Antoniades, producer Nina Kristensen, and technical director Mike Ball once the company was founded. According to Antoniades, the game was prototyped in three months using four to eight people.

In early 2003, Just Add Monsters began working on a more mature sequel to the game titled Kung Fu Story. However, realizing it would be a difficult idea to sell an existing intellectual property (IP) to prospective publishers, they shifted their focus on developing for the next-generation of consoles. Specifically, they started work on a new IP, Heavenly Sword for the PlayStation 3. The company resurfaced in 2004 under the name Ninja Theory after it was purchased by former Argonaut Games CEO Jez San.

Reception

Kung Fu Chaos received "average" reviews according to the review aggregation website Metacritic. In Japan, where the game was ported for release under the name  on 29 May 2003, Famitsu gave it a score of one eight, one seven, one eight, and one seven, for a total of 30 out of 40.

The game was included among the best Xbox party games by IGN in 2005. And has gained a cult following.

References

External links 

2003 video games
3D fighting games
Filmmaking video games
Martial arts video games
Microsoft games
Video games about ninja
Parodies of films
Parody video games
Party video games
Video games developed in the United Kingdom
Works based on Journey to the West
Xbox games
Xbox-only games
Multiplayer and single-player video games
Ninja Theory games